During the 1996–97 Italian football season, F.C. Internazionale Milano competed in Serie A.

Season summary
Inter finished third in the championship and reached the UEFA Cup final in Roy Hodgson's first (and only) full season in charge. The third place was Inter's best since the days of Lothar Matthäus and Andreas Brehme in the early 1990s and a starting point for further success in the coming years. The most significant happening for Inter in 1997 was the purchase of Brazilian striker Ronaldo for a record-breaking fee from Barcelona. The biggest disappointment was the fact that Inter failed to beat Schalke 04 in the UEFA Cup final, and lost the second leg on penalties - at home. The loss meant Hodgson was fired, despite his successful season at the helm.

Squad
Squad at end of season

Transfers

Autumn

Winter

Left club during season

Competitions

Serie A

League table

Results by round

Matches

Coppa Italia

Second round

Eightfinals

Quarterfinals

Semifinals

UEFA Cup

First round

Second round

Eightfinals

Quarterfinals

Semifinals

Final

Statistics

Players statistics

References

Sources
RSSSF - Italy 1996/97

Inter Milan seasons
Internazionale